Caleb Lawrence McGillvary (born September 3, 1988), also referred to as Kai, is a Canadian man who first became known from the internet viral video "Kai the Hatchet-Wielding Hitchhiker", which featured him recounting a crime he witnessed while hitchhiking. McGillvary subsequently received national attention in the press. In 2019, McGillvary was convicted of first-degree murder in New Jersey. He cited the fallout from the video as part of his defense against the homicide charge. In 2023, Netflix debuted the documentary The Hatchet Wielding Hitchhiker about McGillvary's rise to fame and murder trial.

Personal life
McGillvary was born on September 3, 1988, in Edmonton, Alberta, Canada. He has stated that he was raised in a fundamentalist Christian cult, that his parents were divorced, and that he had been molested in his youth. As a teenager, he moved with his family to St. Paul, Alberta, and attended St. Paul Regional High School.

McGillvary has also stated that he adopted the name "Kai" after taking part in a "spirit walk" while living on an Indigenous reservation.

Prior to the Fresno incident in 2013, McGillvary had been living as a transient, which he has described as "homefree". He stated that he did not have health insurance, a social security card, a driver's license, a passport, or any official form of identification.

Fresno incident
In February 2013, McGillvary (identifying himself in the video only as "Kai") was videotaped giving an interview to local Fox affiliate KMPH-TV in Fresno, California. In the video, he described his part in an incident with a man driving his car into a Pacific Gas and Electric employee.  McGillvary recounts he had been hitchhiking and was picked up by Jett Simmons McBride, who McGillvary describes as weighing  and who claimed to be Jesus Christ. In the car, McBride told McGillvary he once raped a fourteen-year-old girl in the Virgin Islands while on a business trip. McBride then crashed into a pedestrian at an intersection, pinning her against the rear of a parked truck. McGillvary jumped out to help the woman, while McBride remained in the car. When a bystander arrived on the scene to help, McBride jumped out and attacked her in a bear hug. Sensing the woman's life might be in danger and believing the man could snap her neck "like a pencil stick", McGillvary removed a hatchet from his backpack and repeatedly struck McBride in the back of the head. In the video, McGillvary describes the hatchet blows with the words "smash, smash, smash" while he reenacts the overhead swings. McGillvary recounts he was interrogated by police and set free.

The video was uploaded to YouTube on February 2, 2013, by Jessob Reisbeck, who had conducted the interview for KMPH. As of January 14, 2023, the video had over 8 million views. The Gregory Brothers sampled the interview and turned it into a song, furthering the video's reach. In January 2020, McGillvary was interviewed on Inside Edition, where scenes from the viral video were replayed. As a result of the viral nature of the original video, McGillvary received extensive offers from various news and entertainment sources seeking interviews and appearances. This resulted in him appearing on Jimmy Kimmel Live! on February 11, 2013.

Murder conviction
McGillvary was arrested on murder charges on May 16, 2013, for the death of New Jersey attorney Joseph Galfy. McGillvary maintained he fought with Galfy in self-defense. According to McGillvary, he had been drugged and raped by Galfy after he offered McGillvary a place to stay for the night. McGillvary stated that the police claimed the sexual encounter was consensual and the murder premeditated. However, McGillvary said that after the viral video in California, he had no need to have sex with men like Galfy, whom McGillvary described as unattractive, stating, "Do you know how many hot chicks—never mind. Even if I was gay, do you know how many hot guys wanted to fuck me after that shit in California? I'm not even being vain. It's just a fact, like—no offense, but he [Galfy] was not a looker". In July 2013, McGillvary was hospitalized after suffering from self-inflicted wounds while awaiting trial at Union County Jail in New Jersey.

After the murder charges, the video views increased substantially, broadening its viral reach. Fans of the video, who considered McGillvary a hero for saving the woman, raised a legal fund. McGillvary was imprisoned for over five years while awaiting trial, which began April 1, 2019. McGillvary took the stand in his own defense and was combative during cross-examination. He had an outburst during his defense lawyer's closing arguments, nearly leading to his expulsion from the courtroom. A jury found him guilty of first-degree murder, and he was sentenced to 57 years in prison. He is to serve 85 percent of that term (roughly 43.5 years, after accounting for the five years of pre-trial confinement) before the possibility of parole, with the judge telling McGillvary, "when you become eligible for parole, you will still be younger than Mr. Galfy was when you murdered him". Galfy was 73 at the time of his death. McGillvary appealed the conviction, alleging 15 instances of "misconduct, abuse of discretion, and ineffectiveness of defense counsel", but the murder conviction was upheld by the New Jersey Appellate Court in August 2021.

He has been housed at the New Jersey State Prison in Trenton since his sentencing.

Netflix documentary
On January 10, 2023, Netflix released the documentary The Hatchet Wielding Hitchhiker, chronicling McGillvary's story, including interviews with Reisbeck, members of Jimmy Kimmel's staff, McGillvary's family, and law enforcement figures involved in his case. In the immediate days following the documentary's release, media interest in McGillvary's case increased.

In response to the documentary, McGillvary claimed that Netflix exploited him for profit.

References

2013 in California
Viral videos
1988 births
Living people
Canadian people convicted of murder
People from Edmonton
2013 YouTube videos